The UEFA Futsal Euro 2016 qualifying competition was a men's futsal competition that determined the 11 teams joining the automatically qualified hosts Serbia in the UEFA Futsal Euro 2016 final tournament.

The national teams from a total of 45 UEFA member associations entered the qualifying competition. Scotland made their UEFA Futsal Euro qualifying debut.

Format
The qualifying competition consisted of three rounds:
Preliminary round: The 24 lowest-ranked teams were drawn into six groups of four teams. Each group was played in single round-robin format at one of the teams which were pre-selected as hosts. The six group winners and the best runner-up advanced to the main round.
Main round: The 28 teams (21 highest-ranked teams and seven preliminary round qualifiers) were drawn into seven groups of four teams. Each group was played in single round-robin format at one of the teams which were pre-selected as hosts. The seven group winners qualified for the final tournament, while the seven runners-up and the best third-placed team advanced to the play-offs.
Play-offs: The eight teams were drawn into four ties to play home-and-away two-legged matches to determine the last four qualified teams.

Tiebreakers
In the preliminary round and main round, the teams were ranked according to points (3 points for a win, 1 point for a draw, 0 points for a loss). If two or more teams were equal on points on completion of a mini-tournament, the following tie-breaking criteria were applied, in the order given, to determine the rankings:
Higher number of points obtained in the mini-tournament matches played among the teams in question;
Superior goal difference resulting from the mini-tournament matches played among the teams in question;
Higher number of goals scored in the mini-tournament matches played among the teams in question;
If, after having applied criteria 1 to 3, teams still had an equal ranking, criteria 1 to 3 were reapplied exclusively to the mini-tournament matches between the teams in question to determine their final rankings. If this procedure did not lead to a decision, criteria 5 to 10 applied;
Superior goal difference in all mini-tournament matches;
Higher number of goals scored in all mini-tournament matches;
If only two teams had the same number of points, and they were tied according to criteria 1 to 6 after having met in the last round of the mini-tournament, their rankings were determined by a penalty shoot-out (not used if more than two teams had the same number of points, or if their rankings were not relevant for qualification for the next stage).
Lower disciplinary points total based only on yellow and red cards received in the mini-tournament matches (red card = 3 points, yellow card = 1 point, expulsion for two yellow cards in one match = 3 points);
Coefficient ranking;
Drawing of lots.

To determine the best runner-up in the preliminary round and the best third-placed team in the main round, the following criteria were applied:
Higher number of points;
Superior goal difference;
Higher number of goals scored;
Lower disciplinary points total based only on yellow and red cards received (red card = 3 points, yellow card = 1 point, expulsion for two yellow cards in one match = 3 points);
Coefficient ranking;
Drawing of lots.

In the play-offs, the team that scored more goals on aggregate over the two legs qualified for the final tournament. If the aggregate score was level, the away goals rule was applied, i.e., the team that scored more goals away from home over the two legs advanced. If away goals were also equal, extra time was played. The away goals rule was again applied after extra time, i.e., if there were goals scored during extra time and the aggregate score was still level, the visiting team advanced by virtue of more away goals scored. If no goals were scored during extra time, the tie was decided by penalty shoot-out.

Schedule
The qualifying matches were played on the following dates.

Entrants
The teams were ranked according to their coefficient ranking, calculated based on the following:
UEFA Futsal Euro 2012 final tournament and qualifying competition
2012 FIFA Futsal World Cup final tournament and qualifying competition
UEFA Futsal Euro 2014 final tournament and qualifying competition

The 21 highest-ranked teams entered the main round, while the 24 lowest-ranked teams entered the preliminary round. The coefficient ranking was also used for seeding in the preliminary round and main round draws.

Notes
Serbia (Coeff: 4.528; Rank: 8) qualified automatically for the final tournament as hosts.
Iceland (Coeff: 0.222; Rank 41), Republic of Ireland (Coeff: 0.000; Rank 47), Austria (no rank), Faroe Islands (no rank), Germany (no rank), Liechtenstein (no rank), Luxembourg (no rank), and Northern Ireland (no rank) did not enter.
Teams which were pre-selected as preliminary round or main round hosts were denoted by (H).

The draws for the preliminary round and main round were held on 26 September 2014, 14:00 CEST (UTC+2), at the UEFA headquarters in Nyon, Switzerland. Each group in the preliminary round and main round contained one team from each of the seeding positions 1–4. The seven teams which qualified from the preliminary round, whose identity was not known at the time of the draw, were placed in seeding position 4 for the main round draw. In both draws, the teams which were pre-selected as hosts were drawn from a separate pot, while being placed in their groups according to their seeding positions. For political reasons, Azerbaijan and Armenia (due to the disputed status of Nagorno-Karabakh), as well as Spain and Gibraltar (due to the disputed status of Gibraltar), could not be drawn in the same group.

Preliminary round
All times were CET (UTC+1).

Group A

Group B

Group C

Group D

Group E

Group F

Ranking of second-placed teams

Main round
All times were CET (UTC+1).

Group 1

Group 2

Group 3

Group 4

Group 5

Group 6

Group 7

Ranking of third-placed teams

Play-offs
The draw for the play-offs was held on 10 June 2015, 14:00 CEST (UTC+2), at the UEFA headquarters in Nyon, Switzerland. There were no seedings, with the only restriction that the best third-placed team (Romania) could not be drawn against the runner-up from the same main round group (Kazakhstan).

All times were CEST (UTC+2).

|}

Hungary won 6–5 on aggregate and qualified for the final tournament.

Kazakhstan won 9–0 on aggregate and qualified for the final tournament.

Czech Republic won 3–2 on aggregate and qualified for the final tournament.

Azerbaijan won 4–2 on aggregate and qualified for the final tournament.

Qualified teams
The following 12 teams qualified for the final tournament.

1 Bold indicates champion for that year. Italic indicates host for that year.

Goalscorers
8 goals
 Mykola Bilotserkivets

7 goals
 Réda Rabei

6 goals
 Mads Falck

5 goals

 Dario Marinović
 Panu Autio
 Mikko Kytölä
 Archil Sebiskveradze
 Maksims Seņs
 Adrijan Micevski
 Ricardinho
 Florin Matei
 Tomáš Drahovský
 Gabriel Rick
 Igor Osredkar
 Lin
 Miguel Balvis Gonzalez

4 goals

 Endrit Kaca
 Henrik Grigoryan
 Franko Jelovčić
 Kevin Jørgensen
 Sid Belhaj
 Ákos Harnisch
 Ádám Hosszú
 Martin Todorovski
 Cristian Obadă
 Kristian Legiec

3 goals

 Azem Brahimi
 Mentor Mejzini
 Nacho Llamas
 Saro Mardanyan
 Fineo de Araujo
 Vitaliy Borisov
 Aleksandr Chernik
 Ahmed Sababti
 Tomo Bevanda
 Daniel Dimov
 Jakov Grcić
 Michal Belej
 Michal Kovács
 Mads Jensen
 Maksim Aleksejev
 Giorgi Tikurishvili
 Zoltán Dróth
 Gabriel Lima
 Douglas Jr.
 Nikolay Pengrin
 Mikhail Pershin
 Chingiz Yesenamanov
 Arsenij Buinickij
 László Szőcs
 Alen Fetić
 Gašper Vrhovec
 Miguelín
 Mario Rivillos
 Sargon Abraham
 Mathias Eteus
 Dan Mönell
 Alessandro Facchinetti
 Yves Mezger
 Cihan Özcan

2 goals

 Erion Hoxha
 Halim Selmanaj
 Carlos Barbosa
 Grigor Kapukranyan
 Andranik Karapetyan
 Davit Sujyan
 Amadeu
 Isa Atayev
 Augusto
 Ramiz Chovdarov
 Eduardo
 Nijaz Mulahmetović
 Anel Radmilović
 Georgi Karageorgiev
 Plamen Stoykov
 Kristijan Grbeša
 Tihomir Novak
 Michal Seidler
 Morten Hauglund
 Jacob Jensen
 Louis Veis
 Luke Ballinger
 Stuart Cook
 Ian Parkes
 Martin Taska
 Vladislav Tšurilkin
 Jukka Kytölä
 Adrien Gasmi
 Abdessamad Mohammed
 Alonso Ramirez
 Alexandre Teixeira
 Aleksandr Dzabiradze
 Adam Cohen
 Oz Sabag
 Rodolfo Fortino
 Daniel Giasson
 Leo
 Dauren Nurgozhin
 Andrejs Aleksejevs
 Igors Avanesovs
 Oskars Ikstēns
 Artūrs Jerofejevs
 Sergejs Nagibins
 Andrejs Šustrovs
 Marius Bezykornovas
 Jurij Jeremejev
 Lukas Sendžikas
 Oleg Hilotii
 Sergiu Tacot
 Bojan Bajović
 Pedro Cary
 Emil Răducu
 Dumitru Stoica
 Sergei Abramov
 Danil Kutuzov
 Dmitri Lyskov
 Anton Brunovský
 Dušan Rafaj
 Kristjan Čujec
 Benjamin Melink
 Rok Mordej
 Alex
 Raúl Campos
 Pola
 Hanna Abraham
 Niklas Asp
 Henry Acosta
 Mato Sego
 Yasin Erdal
 Yevhen Ivanyak
 Denys Ovsyannikov
 Dmytro Sorokin

1 goal

 Roald Halimi
 Cabinho
 Jonathan Perez
 Marçal Raventós
 Armen Babayan
 Saro Galstyan
 Sargis Nasibyan
 Rajab Farajzade
 Rizvan Farzaliyev
 Yuri Aleinikov
 Aleksei Popov
 Sebastiano Canaris
 Karim Chaibai
 Mohamed Dahbi Reda
 Valentin Dujacquier
 Omar Rahou
 Mirko Hrkač
 Nermin Kahvedžić
 Dražen Novoselac
 Yosif Shutev
 Saša Babić
 Maro Djuraš
 Andrej Pandurević
 Josip Suton
 Christos Iacovou
 Jiří Novotný
 Matěj Slováček
 Radim Záruba
 Jim Jensen
 Morten Larsen
 Rasmus Lucht
 George Nash
 Agon Rexha
 Kristjan Paapsi
 Pavel Rubel
 Aleksandr Starodub
 Joni Pakola
 Azdine Aigoun
 Kamel Hamdoud
 Mustapha Otmani
 Giorgi Altunashvili
 Vakhtangi Jvarashvili
 Zurab Lukava
 Kakhaber Maisaia
 Roni
 Nikoloz Zedelashvili
 Justin Collado
 Ivan Robba
 Vasilis Asimakopoulos
 Giannis Delaportas
 Akis Iliadis
 Antonios Manos
 Sokratis Mourdoukoutas
 István Gál
 Tamás Lódi
 Péter Németh
 János Rábl
 János Trencsényi
 Golan Kalimi
 Idan Shkolnik
 Eran Vana
 Mauro Canal
 Marco Ercolessi
 Murilo Ferreira
 Alessandro Patias
 Konstantin Chebotarev
 Higuita
 Pavel Taku
 Serik Zhamankulov
 Igors Dacko
 Justinas Zagurskas
 Ivan Krstevski
 Zoran Leveski
 Oleg Gojan
 Andrian Laşcu
 Alexei Munteanu
 Leonid Podlesnov
 Alexandr Ţîmbalist
 Marko Bajčetić
 Milovan Drašković
 Mohamed Attaibi
 Jamal El Ghannouti
 Stian Sortevik
 Michał Kubik
 Artur Popławski
 Igor Sobalczyk
 Sebastian Wojciechowski
 Tiago Brito
 Cardinal
 Bruno Coelho
 Djô
 Paulinho
 Ion Al-Ioani
 Csoma Alpar
 Szabolcs Mánya
 Marius Matei
 Andrei Batyrev
 Nikolai Pereverzev
 Romulo
 Sergei Sergeev
 Federico Macina
 Garry Hay
 Scott Lafferty
 Marek Bahna
 Juraj Višváder
 Nejc Hozjan
 Adri
 Aicardo
 Fernandão
 Patrik Burda
 Albert Hiseni
 Dida Rashidi
 Xhemajl Likaj
 Evangelos Marcoyannakis
 Salvatore Patera
 Yannick Raboud
 Andri Rueegsegger
 Fabio Santona
 Cem Keskin
 Kenan Köseoğlu
 Servet Yazgan
 Dmytro Bondar
 Roman Kordoba
 Oleksandr Sorokin
 Chris Hugh
 Daniel Hooper
 Elliot Thomas

Own goals

 Aleksandr Chernik (against Czech Republic)
 Aleksandr Gayduk (against Italy)
 Anel Radmilović (against Netherlands)
 Adrien Gasmi (against Czech Republic)
 Gyula Tóth (against Switzerland)
 Stefano Mammarella (against Poland)
 Oskars Ikstēns (against Netherlands)
 Ferid Agushi (against Hungary)
 Martin Todorovski (against Spain)
 Mats Velseboer (against Latvia)
 James Yates (against Israel)
 Peter Kozár (against Azerbaijan)
 Sami Büyüktopaç (against Croatia)
 Serhiy Zhurba (against Azerbaijan)
 Dean Maynard (against Montenegro)

References

External links

Qualifying
2016
Euro 2016 qualifying
Euro 2016 qualifying